The Bank of Holland is a Federal Deposit Insurance Corporation-insured banking corporation that was founded and is headquartered in the town of Holland, New York.  It offers a wide range of banking services including savings and checking accounts, mortgages and business and personal loans.  The bank has three branches- one in Holland, one in East Aurora, New York, and new one in Elma, New York a former Bank of America branch and automated teller machines throughout Western New York state.

References

External links 

 Bank of Holland website
 New York Chartered Bank List

Banks based in New York (state)
Erie County, New York
Banks established in 1893
1893 establishments in New York (state)